Slavomír Bartoň (22 January 1926 in Lipůvka – 16 January 2004 in Brno) was a Czech ice hockey player who competed in the 1952 Winter Olympics and in the 1956 Winter Olympics.

References

External links

1926 births
2004 deaths
People from Blansko District
HC Kometa Brno players
Ice hockey players at the 1952 Winter Olympics
Ice hockey players at the 1956 Winter Olympics
Olympic ice hockey players of Czechoslovakia
PSG Berani Zlín players
Sportspeople from the South Moravian Region
Czechoslovak expatriate sportspeople in Italy
Czechoslovak expatriate ice hockey people
Czech ice hockey centres
Czechoslovak ice hockey centres
Czech ice hockey coaches
Czechoslovak ice hockey coaches